Błędowo may refer to the following places:
Błędowo, Wąbrzeźno County in Kuyavian-Pomeranian Voivodeship (north-central Poland)
Błędowo, Włocławek County in Kuyavian-Pomeranian Voivodeship (north-central Poland)
Błędowo, Nowy Dwór Mazowiecki County in Masovian Voivodeship (east-central Poland)
Błędowo, Ostrołęka County in Masovian Voivodeship (east-central Poland)
Błędowo, Warmian-Masurian Voivodeship (north Poland)